Simone Inzaghi (born 5 April 1976) is an Italian professional football manager and former player. He is the head coach of Serie A club Inter Milan.

The younger brother of Filippo Inzaghi, Simone played as a striker for a host of clubs during his professional career, including Piacenza and Lazio. He remained for more than a decade at the Roman club, winning major honours including a scudetto in the 1999–2000 season, a European Super Cup, three Coppa Italias and two Supercoppa Italianas. He earned three caps for Italy in as many years.

Following his retirement from playing, he embarked on a managerial career, initially in Lazio's youth teams before taking charge of the senior side in 2016 and guiding them to the Coppa Italia and the Supercoppa Italiana twice. As a manager, Inzaghi is known for employing the 3–5–2 formation, being one of several Italian coaches that have led a notable revival of this tactical system. In 2021, he was appointed as manager of Inter Milan.

Playing career

Club
Inzaghi started playing professionally in 1993 with hometown club Piacenza, although he did not get to feature in any matches with the first team in that season. The following year, he was loaned out to third division side Carpi; his first goal arrived in 1995–96, whilst at the service of Novara in the fourth level. After two more loan stints, at Lumezzane and U.S. Brescello, Inzaghi returned to Piacenza for the 1998–99 Serie A season, which would be his first in the top-flight of Italian football. He scored 15 goals in 30 matches and secured a transfer to powerhouses Lazio.

Despite stiff competition within a Lazio side packed with quality strikers such as Marcelo Salas and Alen Bokšić, the rotation policy of manager Sven-Göran Eriksson ensured that Inzaghi would get playing time; he appeared in 22 out of 34 Serie A matches in Lazio's highly successful 1999–2000 season scoring 7 goals, as his team went on to complete the domestic Double by winning both the Scudetto and the Coppa Italia. In the Champions League, as Lazio progressed from both the first and the second group stages to reach the quarter-finals, Inzaghi scored 9 goals in 11 games (including four in a single game against Marseille on 14 March 2000, equalling the competition record held by Marco van Basten since 1992).

The following seasons were not so successful, but Inzaghi did help Lazio conquer another Coppa Italia, in 2003–04; in September of that year, he extended his contract until June 2009. Inzaghi spent the latter half of the 2004–05 season with Sampdoria, as part of a six-month player exchange with Fabio Bazzani. He returned to Lazio for the 2005–06 campaign and stayed for the following, with only 12 appearances combined. The following season, Inzaghi joined Atalanta on loan. Although he struggled to find his form early on, he managed to play in 19 league matches, mostly as a second-half substitute, but did not find the net.

Inzaghi returned to Lazio in 2008–09, despite not being in the plans of manager Delio Rossi. A move away did not materialise and Inzaghi made his comeback in a 2–0 Cup win over former team Atalanta;  the season would end with Lazio winning the Coppa Italia, Inzaghi's third triumph in this competition, although he did not get to play in the final. In the Serie A, Inzaghi made his first league appearance of the season in October, coming from the bench and scoring an equaliser two minutes from time to rescue a point against Lecce, in a 1–1 home draw; it was his first Serie A goal since September 2004, but he would only appear in 12 games over two years, choosing to retire in the summer of 2010 at the age of 34.

International
Inzaghi played 3 times for Italy, in friendly matches. His first appearance came under Dino Zoff on 29 March 2000, in a 0–2 away loss against Spain in Barcelona. He came on in the 60th minute for Stefano Fiore, partnering his older brother Filippo upfront; he made two more appearances for his country under Giovanni Trapattoni, in a 1–0 win over England in Turin on 15 November later the same year and in another 1–0 win against Romania in Ancona, on 16 November 2003.

Style of play
Throughout his career, Inzaghi's playing style was compared to that of his older brother Filippo and Paolo Rossi. Although he was not particularly skilful from a technical standpoint, he was a tall and fast striker with a slender physique, who was mainly known for his eye for goal, ability to play on the edge of the offside trap and clinical finishing inside the penalty area, in particular from close range, due to his opportunism and positional sense.

Managerial career

Lazio
Following his retirement, Inzaghi remained with Lazio, managing its Allievi and Primavera sides. On 3 April 2016, he was appointed at the senior team on an interim basis following the sacking of Stefano Pioli.

For the 2016–17 season, Inzaghi was originally replaced by Marcelo Bielsa. However, as the Argentine left his post after less than one week due to undisclosed reasons, he was named as permanent manager. He guided the team to fifth place in the domestic league as well as the final of the Italian Cup, lost to Juventus; on 7 June 2017, he renewed his contract until 2020.

The 2017–18 campaign started with a high note, as Lazio defeated Juventus in the Supercoppa Italiana with a 3–2 result. They again finished fifth in Serie A, missing out on Champions League qualification on the final matchday after a 2–3 home loss to Inter Milan.

The 2018–19 season saw the side win the domestic cup 2–0 over Atalanta, conquering their seventh title overall and automatically qualifying for the group stage of the UEFA Europa League.

On 22 December 2019, Inzaghi captured his second Supercoppa Italiana title with Lazio, following a 3–1 victory over Juventus.

In the 2019–20 Serie A season, he led Lazio to finish fourth, which earned them the right to play in the 2020–21 UEFA Champions League, for the first time since 2007–08. Lazio managed to reach the round of 16 in the 2020–21 Champions League.

Inter Milan
On 27 May 2021, following reports linking him as the next manager of Inter Milan, Lazio confirmed that Inzaghi had officially left the club. On 3 June 2021, Inzaghi signed a two-year contract as coach of Inter Milan.

In his first season as Inter manager, Inzaghi won the Supercoppa Italiana on 12 January 2022 and the Coppa Italia on 11 May 2022, defeating Juventus F.C. at the end of extra-time in both cases, respectively 2-1 at San Siro and 4-2 at Stadio Olimpico. He finished the Serie A championship in second place, being the most prolific attacking side with 84 goals, and the Champions League campaign in the round of sixteen, being eliminated by Liverpool with a 1-2 on aggregate (2-0 defeat at San Siro and 1-0 win at Anfield).

Style of management
Inzaghi has built a reputation for getting the most out of his players. He is known for deploying a 3-5-2 formation with wingbacks that like to get forward and join in the attacking play. In his preferred formation, two central strikers are supported by an attacking midfielder who sits just in front of the other two players in midfield. It is a tactically fluid system which appears like a 5-3-2 out of possession as the wingbacks drop back into defence. Inzaghi is also known for his versatility in how he sets his team up to defend. During his spell at Lazio, he implemented both a high press and a mid-block to win the ball back when their opponents were in possession.

Personal life
Born in Piacenza, Emilia-Romagna, Simone Inzaghi is the younger brother of Filippo Inzaghi, who also became a footballer and striker. A world-class forward, Filippo had very successful spells with Juventus and A.C. Milan, winning all domestic Italian titles as well as the UEFA Champions League twice, while also helping the Italy national team win the 2006 FIFA World Cup.

Simone Inzaghi has three sons, Tommaso (born 29 April 2001), with actress and television presenter Alessia Marcuzzi (relationship ended in 2004), Lorenzo (born 14 April 2013) and Andrea (born 8 August 2020), with wife Gaia Lucariello (whom he married on 3 June 2018).

Career statistics

Club

International

Managerial statistics

Honours

Player
Novara
Serie C2: 1995–96

Lumezzane
Serie C2: 1996–97

Lazio
Serie A: 1999–2000
Coppa Italia: 1999–2000, 2003–04, 2008–09
Supercoppa Italiana: 2000
UEFA Super Cup: 1999

Manager
Lazio
Coppa Italia: 2018–19
Supercoppa Italiana: 2017, 2019

Inter Milan
Coppa Italia: 2021–22
Supercoppa Italiana: 2021, 2022

Individual
Serie A Coach of the Month: December 2021

See also
 List of Inter Milan managers

References

External links

AIC profile  
National team data  
Italia1910 profile 

1976 births
Living people
Sportspeople from Piacenza
Footballers from Emilia-Romagna
Italian footballers
Association football forwards
Piacenza Calcio 1919 players
A.C. Carpi players
Novara F.C. players
S.S. Lazio players
U.C. Sampdoria players
Atalanta B.C. players
Serie A players
Serie C players
Italy youth international footballers
Italy international footballers
Italian football managers
S.S. Lazio managers
Inter Milan managers
Serie A managers